The following is a list of partner universities of Lund University:

Europe 
  University of Vienna, Austria
  University of Tartu, Estonia
  University of Orléans, France
  University of Greifswald, Germany
  University of Heidelberg, Germany
  Kiel University of Applied Sciences, Germany
  Ludwig Maximilian University of Munich, Germany
  University of Mannheim, Germany
  University of Passau, Germany
  University of Amsterdam, The Netherlands
  University of Groningen, The Netherlands
  Radboud University Nijmegen, The Netherlands
  Saint Petersburg State University, Russia
  University of Lausanne, HEC Lausanne, Switzerland
  University of Geneva, Switzerland
  University of St. Gallen, Switzerland
  Durham University Business School, United Kingdom
  University of Edinburgh, United Kingdom
  Queen's University Belfast, United Kingdom
  University of Leeds, United Kingdom
  University of Exeter, United Kingdom

Elsewhere 
  University of Adelaide, Australia
  Griffith University, Australia
  RMIT University, Australia
  University of Melbourne, Australia
  Bond University, Australia
  University of Newcastle, Australia
  University of New South Wales, Australia
  University of Queensland, Australia
  University of Canterbury, New Zealand
  University of São Paulo, Brazil
  Université Laval, Canada
  McGill University, Canada
  Queen's University
  University of British Columbia
  University of Ottawa
  University of Chile, Chile
  Peking University, China
  Zhejiang University, China
  University of Hong Kong, Hong Kong
  University of Tokyo, Japan
  University of Cape Town, South Africa
  North Carolina State University
  Michigan State University
  University of California, Berkeley
  University of California, Los Angeles, United States
  University of California, Santa Barbara
  University of California, Santa Cruz
  University of California, San Diego
  University of North Carolina at Chapel Hill
  University of Texas at Austin
  University of Virginia
  Oklahoma State University
  Purdue University
  Babson College
  Suffolk University
  National University of Singapore
  Nanyang Technological University
  Singapore Management University
  University of Jordan

References

Lund University